Jambusar is a town and a municipality in Bharuch district in the Indian state of Gujarat.

Geography
Jambusar has an average elevation of 4 metres (13 feet).

Demographics
The Jambusar Municipality has population of 50,000 of which 27,000 are males while 23,000 are females as per report released by Census India 2019.

Population of Children with age of 0-6 is 5155 which is 11.89% of total population of Jambusar (M). In Jambusar Municipality, Female Sex Ratio is of 929 against state average of 919. Moreover, Child Sex Ratio in Jambusar is around 936 compared to Gujarat state average of 890. Literacy rate of Jambusar city is 82.36% higher than state average of 78.03%. In Jambusar, Male literacy is around 88.90% while female literacy rate is 75.31%.

Origin of name
Jambusara(old name) was part of Lata region, currently in South Gujarat. A Jambusara brahmanas tribe lived at that spot. The name Jambusar is derived from their name JAMBU{(Yama/Shiva),Bu means water(old Tibetan language) + "SAR" (which means ''Lake' in [Sanskrit] and Lion )}(1). 
There is a lake named "NAGESHWAR TALAV" in the city centre.

Places to visit
 Khanpurdeh Village (Riyasat E Khanpur)
 Shri Harirayaji Mahaprabhuji Bethak Mandir - Bhankhetar 2 km
 Shri Acharya Mahaprabhuji Bethak Mandir - Dabha 2 km
 Gandhi Ashram
 Pisad Mahadev temple 
 Jamiah educational complex 
 Jamiah Uloomul Quran Jambusar
 Markaz Masjid Noorani
 Dargah of Ganjsaheed Baba Alayhir Rehma
 Kavi Village 20 km- Historical Port, Jamiah Arabiyyah Naqibul Islam and Jain Temple (Sasu Vahu Na Jain Derasar)
 Shri Sthambeshwar Mahadeva ji Tirth - Kavi - Kamboi
 Sarod Village - Located 65 km towards north from district headquarter Bharuch.

References

1)Journal Of R.A.S vol 1 N.S. pages 268-283.

Cities and towns in Bharuch district